Ewunia is a genus of moths belonging to the family Tortricidae.

Species
Ewunia aureorufa Razowski & Becker, 2002
Ewunia gemella Razowski & Becker, 2002

See also
List of Tortricidae genera

References

 , 2002, SHILAP revista de lepididopterologia 30: 213..
 , 2005, World Catalogue of Insects 5

External links
tortricidae.com

Euliini
Tortricidae genera